Mare Harbour is a small settlement on East Falkland, on Choiseul Sound. It is mostly used as a port facility and depot for RAF Mount Pleasant, as well as a deepwater port used by the Royal Navy ships patrolling the South Atlantic and Antarctica, which means that the main harbour of the islands, Stanley Harbour tends to deal with commercial transport.

During the 1982 Falklands War, Mare Harbour was considered as one of the potential sites for a British amphibious landing but the British landings took place on San Carlos Water in the west of East Falkland, on Falkland Sound. Mare Harbour was considered open to air attack.

In the latter 2010s, Mare Harbour berths were improved with a £22 million investment. The improvements enhanced the roll-on/roll-off jetty, used by the Ministry of Defence's Point-class sealift ships, and upgraded other facilities at Mare Harbour, including fire-fighting services. 

A daily bus service runs between Mare Harbour and Mount Pleasant.

See also
 Military of the Falkland Islands
 RAF Mount Pleasant

References

External links
 James Rogers and Luis Simón.  The Status and Location of the Military Installations of the Member States of the European Union and Their Potential Role for the European Security and Defence Policy (ESDP). Brussels: European Parliament, 2009.  25 pp.

Populated places on East Falkland
Military of the Falkland Islands
Ports and harbours of the Falkland Islands